The following is a list of the MuchMusic Video Awards winners for MuchLOUD Best Rock Video from 2002 to present. Best Rock Video is from 1999 to 2001.

MuchMusic Video Awards
Rock music awards